Wheatland is an unincorporated community in Jefferson County, West Virginia, United States. Wheatland lies along Bullskin Run on the Berryville Pike (U.S. Route 340) at its junction with County Route 340/2.

References

Unincorporated communities in Jefferson County, West Virginia
Unincorporated communities in West Virginia